Bles may refer to:

 Chantemerle-les-Blés, commune in the Drôme department in southeastern France
 Piz Bles, mountain in the Oberhalbstein Alp

People
 Bles Bridges, South African singer
 David Bles (1821-1899), painter from the Northern Netherlands
 Geoffrey Bles (1886–1957), British publisher
 Herri met de Bles (c.1510–c.1555–1560), Flemish painter